Isoindene is a flammable polycyclic hydrocarbon with chemical formula C9H8. It is composed of a cyclohexadiene ring fused with a cyclopentadiene ring.

See also 
 Indene
 Isoindole
 Isoindenone

Polycyclic nonaromatic hydrocarbons